The Parker's pigmy gecko (Tropiocolotes somalicus) is a species of gecko of the genus Tropiocolotes. It is found in Somalia, Ethiopia and Djibouti.

References

somalicus
Reptiles described in 1942
Reptiles of Somalia
Reptiles of Ethiopia